Druk is the legendary Thunder Dragon of Bhutan.

Druk may also refer to:

Bhutan
 Druk, of or pertaining to Bhutan 
of or pertaining to the Ngalop people, the majority ethnicity in Bhutan
 Druk Gyalpo "Thunder Dragon King", the formal title of the King of Bhutan
 Drukyul, the Dzongkha name for Bhutan, translates to Land of the Thunder Dragon
 Druk tsendhen, the national anthem of Bhutan
 Druk Air, the national airline of Bhutan
 Druk Phuensum Tshogpa, the Bhutan Peace and Prosperity Party
 Drukpa Kagyu, an independent branch of the Kagyu school of Tibetan Buddhism and the state religion of Bhutan
 Gyalwang Drukpa, the honorific title of the head of the Drukpa Lineage

Other uses
 Druk, a kind of small round Bohemian glass bead